"On Growing Older" is a song by English band Strawbs written by Dave Cousins. The track first appeared on the Grave New World album, although it was written and recorded a few years earlier. The original recording was later released on the Strawberry Sampler Number 1 album.

Lyrical and musical content
As befits its place on the album, the song describes "a regret for the waste of my youth" of a middle-aged person who nonetheless realises that they still have time to accomplish some of their ambitions. The imagery is pastoral and natural, similar to "Another Day" from the Dragonfly album or perhaps "A Glimpse of Heaven" from From the Witchwood. The instrumentation is simple, and the jangling guitar sounds are evocative of The Byrds, of whom Cousins is a fan.

Personnel
Dave Cousins – lead vocals, acoustic guitar
Tony Hooper – backing vocals, 12-string guitar
John Ford – bass guitar
Richard Hudson – drums

References

Sleeve notes to album CD 540 934-2 Grave New World (A&M 1998 Remastered)
Grave New World 30th anniversary article on Strawbsweb

External links
Lyrics to "On Growing Older" at Strawbsweb official site

Template

Strawbs songs
1972 songs
Songs written by Dave Cousins